Edward Azzopardi (born 13 December 1977 in Rabat, Malta) is a professional footballer currently playing for Maltese First Division side Żejtun Corinthians, where he plays as a defender.

External links
 Edward Azzopardi at MaltaFootball.com
 

Living people
1977 births
Maltese footballers
Malta international footballers
Rabat Ajax F.C. players
Valletta F.C. players
Pietà Hotspurs F.C. players
Hibernians F.C. players
Qormi F.C. players
Żejtun Corinthians F.C. players
Association football defenders